Vysoký Újezd is a municipality and village in Benešov District in the Central Bohemian Region of the Czech Republic. It has about 200 inhabitants.

Administrative parts
The village of Větrov is an administrative part of Vysoký Újezd.

References

Villages in Benešov District